Daniel James Alcock (born 15 February 1984) is an English former professional footballer who played as a goalkeeper.

Club career

Early career
Alcock was born in Newcastle-under-Lyme, Staffordshire, and joined Stoke City as a trainee from school. He turned professional in August 2001, but was released in May 2003 without making his first team debut for Stoke, signing for local side Stone Dominoes and subsequently moving on to Kidsgrove Athletic.

Barnsley
He joined Barnsley in August 2003. He was understudy to first Saša Ilić and then Marlon Beresford, but finally made his league debut on 12 April 2004 in a 3–3 draw at home to Queens Park Rangers, replacing the injured Beresford midway through the first half. That was his only first team appearance for Barnsley and he was released at the end of the season.

Accrington Stanley
He joined Accrington Stanley in July 2004, playing five times in the Conference the following season. In the 2005–06 season, Accrington won the title and promotion to the Football League, but Alcock played just once, in the 2–0 defeat away to Kidderminster Harriers on the final day of the season as Stanley rested regular keeper Robert Elliot. He would have played more often, in particular when a broken arm in a reserve game prevented him from replacing the injured and soon to retire Stuart Jones. He was released soon after that game

Stafford Rangers
Alcock joined Stafford Rangers in August 2006, quickly establishing himself as Rangers' regular goalkeeper the following season. At the end of the 2007–08 season, Alcock won the fans player of the season, managers player of the season and the players' player of the season awards for his great goalkeeping, despite conceding almost 100 goals that year. Alcock stayed as the first choice goalkeeper in 2008–09, fighting off tough competition from new goalkeeper Tim Sandercombe.

Tamworth
On 18 December 2008, Alcock made the short journey to local side, Tamworth.

Following promotion to the Conference National, Alcock was forced to leave the club due to university commitments. He explained he could make weekend and night games, but wouldn't be able to part take in training during the week, it is likely he will return to the Conference North with a new club next season, and would continue living in the midlands area.

It was confirmed by manager Gary Mills on 15 July 2010 that Alcock wouldn't be returning to The Lambs for the 2010–11 season.

Nuneaton Town
Alcock signed for Nuneaton Town on 5 August 2010 following a successful trial period.

Coaching career
Alcock worked as a goalkeeping coach on a part-time basis at the Stoke City Academy from 2010 to 2018.

On 26 August 2021, Alcock was confirmed as the goalkeeping coach of the England U20s. Alcock joined Nottingham Forest in September 2021.

International career
Alcock played for the England C team in their match against Northern Ireland in 2007. Alcock was selected for the Team GBR squad that won the silver medal at the 2011 Summer Universiade.

Personal life
Alcock's younger brother Adam is also a goalkeeper in non-league football. Their father is Barry Alcock, the former Stafford Rangers goalkeeper in the 1980s.

Career statistics

Honours
Individual
Tamworth Player of the Year: 2009–10

References

External links

1984 births
Living people
Accrington Stanley F.C. players
Barnsley F.C. players
National League (English football) players
English footballers
England semi-pro international footballers
Association football goalkeepers
Kidsgrove Athletic F.C. players
Sportspeople from Newcastle-under-Lyme
Footballers from Stoke-on-Trent
Stafford Rangers F.C. players
Stoke City F.C. players
Tamworth F.C. players
Nuneaton Borough F.C. players
English Football League players
Stone Dominoes F.C. players
Stoke City F.C. non-playing staff
Universiade silver medalists for Great Britain
Universiade medalists in football
Medalists at the 2011 Summer Universiade
Nottingham Forest F.C. non-playing staff